Unfold the Future is the seventh studio album by the progressive rock band The Flower Kings, which was released in 2002. It is also the band's third studio double-CD. A limited special edition of the album contained an instrumental bonus track.

This album is the first appearance of both drummer Zoltan Csörsz, replacing the original member Jaime Salazar, and Pain of Salvation's frontman Daniel Gildenlöw, the latter as a guest vocalist on several tracks.

The style of the album shows several influences of jazz music and experimentation, with the inclusion of two free-form jams (or three, counting the special edition bonus track), along with the band's traditional symphonic progressive rock style.

In 2017, the album was remixed and reissued on vinyl. The 2017 version was also included in the box set A Kingdom of Colours: The Complete Collection from 1995-2002.

Track listing

Disc One

Disc Two

Note: For the 2017 reissue, "Devil's Playground" has a reduced running time of 19:02.

Personnel

Main band
Tomas Bodin - keyboards
Hasse Bruniusson - marimba, glockenspiel, dulcimer, other percussion
Zoltan Csörsz - drums
Hasse Fröberg - vocals, guitars
Jonas Reingold - bass guitar
Roine Stolt - vocals, guitars, keyboards

Guest musicians
Daniel Gildenlöw - backing vocals, lead vocals on "Fast Lane", "Rollin' the Dice" and parts of "Devil's Playground"
Ulf Wallander - soprano saxophone
Anders Bergcrantz - trumpet

References

2002 albums
The Flower Kings albums
Inside Out Music albums